Unity is a town in the western part of the Canadian province of Saskatchewan
with a population of 2573. Unity is located at the intersection of Highway 14 and Highway 21, and the intersection of the CNR and CPR main rail lines.

The town was the subject of playwright Kevin Kerr's Governor General's Award-winning play Unity (1918), which dramatizes the effect of the 1918 flu pandemic on Unity.

History
With the coming of the Grand Trunk Pacific Railway in 1908 Unity began to grow from a small settlement in 1904 to about 600 in the 1920s. By 1966 there were 2,154 residents.

Demographics 

Attractions
Attractions in the Town of Unity include:
the history murals in downtown 
Unity & District Heritage Museum
Unity Golf Course   
Unity Regional Park housing the Unity Ball Diamonds 
Unity Arena.  
Unity Credit Union Aquatics Centre
Sink and Gordon Lakes are just to the west of Unity, providing wetlands for many migratory birds.  
Muddy Lake is just south of town.

Notable people
Boyd Gordon, NHL hockey player
Curtis Brown, NHL hockey player

Education
Two elementary schools, St. Peter's Catholic School and Unity Public School offers Kindergarten to Grade 6. Unity Composite High School (UCHS) includes grades 7 to 12. The two public schools are in the Living Sky School Division No. 202.

The population of the elementary schools ranges at about 150 students each, while UCHS is between 250 and 300 students with a graduating class of about 30-45 students a year.

Transportation
The Unity railway station receives Via Rail service with The Canadian calling at Unity several times per week.  Unity is on the Canadian National Railway tracks.  In 1924, the Canadian Pacific Railway crossed the Canadian National Railway at Topaz just west of Unity.

See also
List of towns in Saskatchewan
List of rural municipalities in Saskatchewan

References

External links

Round Valley No. 410, Saskatchewan
Towns in Saskatchewan
Division No. 13, Saskatchewan